Mark Tucker may refer to:

 Mark Tucker (offensive lineman) (born 1968), American football lineman
 Mark Tucker (American football coach), head coach of the Charleston Southern Buccaneers
 Mark Tucker (business) (born 1957), English businessman
 Mark Tucker (footballer) (born 1972), English football right back
 Mark Tucker (musician) (born 1957), a.k.a. T. Storm Hunter, musician and co-founder of Tetrapod Spools
 Mark Tucker, musicologist and jazz pianist (died 2000), married to Carol J. Oja
 Mark Tucker (rugby union) (born 1980), English rugby union player
 Mark Tucker, tenor in a recording of the opera Ruth

See also
 Marc Tucker (born 1940), president and CEO of the National Center on Education and the Economy